Reolon is a surname. Notable people with the surname include:

 Jason Reolon (born 1976), South African pianist
 Marcio Reolon, Brazilian film director, screenwriter, producer, and actor
 Sergio Reolon (1951–2017), Italian politician